Phlepsiini is a tribe of leafhoppers in the subfamily Deltocephalinae. There are 4 genera and over 80 described species in Phlepsiini.

Genera
There are currently 4 described genera in the tribe Phlepsiini:
 Excultanus Oman, 1949 
Korana 
Phlepsius 
 Texananus Ball, 1918

References

Further reading

External links

 

 
Deltocephalinae
Hemiptera tribes